Huangjin is a town in Luocheng Mulao Autonomous County, Guangxi, China.

Etymology
The town got its name because the region once produced gold in ancient times.

Administrative division
As of 2021, the town is divided into one community and seven villages: 
Huangjin Community
Simen
Baoju
Zhaibei
Zhaidao
Yihe
Beisheng
Youdong

History
Huangjin District was founded in 1925 during the Republic of China. 

In 1958, the region split into two communes: Simen People's Commune and Huangjin People's Commune, and Simen People's Commune merged into Huangjin People's Commune four years later. Its name was changed to Huangjin Township in October 1984 and it was upgraded to a town in 1993.

Geography
It lies at the northeast of Luocheng Mulao Autonomous County, bordering Qiaoshan Township to the west, the town of Dongmen to the south, Baotan Township to the north, and the town of Long'an to the east.

There are two rivers flow through the town: Wuyang River and Huangjin River.

Economy
The town's economy is based on agriculture and animal husbandry. Significant crops include rice and corn. Sugarcane, peanut, rape are the economic plants of this region.

Demographics

The 2019 census reported the town had a population of 24,940.

References

Bibliography

 

Divisions of Luocheng Mulao Autonomous County